Norfolk damselfly or dark bluet (Coenagrion armatum) is a species of blue damselfly of the family Coenagrionidae. This species acquired its common name from its discovery in 1903 and presence in a very restricted area of the Norfolk Broads. Records came from Sutton, Stalham, and Hickling Broads.

Identification

At first glance, this damselfly may resemble a blue-tailed damselfly or a red-eyed damselfly more than a typical Coenagrion species. Both sexes have a distinctive black abdomen with coloured segments at both the base and the tip. Males have very large appendages that distinguish them from similar species.

Breeding
This damselfly was lost from its British sites due to natural succession from open water to dry reedbeds. It breeds in ponds ditches and slow rivers with open helophyte vegetation and a good water quality. It is less critical in northern and eastern Europe

Its breeding biology is poorly known. Eggs are laid in the stems and leaves of aquatic plants. The larvae live amongst aquatic plants and probably emerge after one year.

Behaviour
It was recorded in Britain from late May to late July. The current populations in Western Europe fly earlier and peak in early May. Males perch on floating leaves. It is a strong-flying damselfly.

Status and distribution

It is found from Northern and Eastern Europe eastwards to Siberia and Mongolia. It was believed to be lost in the Netherlands in the 20th century but was rediscovered there in 1999.

Status in Britain
The species was formerly recorded as a breeding species in Britain, in Norfolk. It was last recorded in 1968. Since its main range is from the Baltic area eastwards, the likelihood of recolonisation in Britain seems low.

References

 Coenagrion armatum. Watson, L., and Dallwitz, M.J. 2003 onwards. British insects: the Odonata (dragonflies and damselflies).

Norfolk Broads
Damselflies of Europe
Coenagrionidae
Insects described in 1840